Actors Touring Company (ATC) is a touring theatre company based in London, founded in 1978 by Artistic Director John Retallack. Previous Artistic Directors have included Mark Brickman, Ceri Sherlock, Nick Philippou, Gordon Anderson, Bijan Sheibani, Ramin Gray and the current Artistic Director Matthew Xia (2018 - present).

Since 2007 the company has toured internationally and throughout the UK receiving  Olivier Award nominations for the productions of The Brothers Size with the Young Vic and Ivan and the Dogs with Soho Theatre. ATC won an Olivier Award for the production of Gone Too Far! with the Royal Court Theatre. In 2021, ATC’s commission ‘Family Tree’ by Mojisola Adebayo won the 25th Alfred Fagon Award, in a ceremony held at the National Theatre.

The company pursues a policy of internationalism — making theatre collaboratively with artists from abroad, as well as with the voices of the global nations with the UK.

Matthew Xia's tenure (2018 - present)  
 2021-2 Rice by Michele Lee, co-produced with Orange Tree Theatre, directed by Matthew Xia
 2021 Family Tree by Mojisola Adebayo, co-produced with Greenwich & Docklands International Festival and Young Vic, directed by Matthew Xia
 2021 Dear Tomorrow: Hope from Home, co-produced with Northern Stage, by Ameera Conrad, Satinder Chohan, Hannah Khalid, Nemo Martin, Chiméne Suleyman, Eve Leigh, directed by Matthew Xia and Natalie Ibu  
 2020 Dear Tomorrow by Maya Arad Yasur, Kimber Lee & Stephanie Street (letters of hope delivered during COVID lockdowns) directed by Matthew Xia 
 2019 Amsterdam by Maya Arad Yasur, co-produced with Orange Tree Theatre & Theatre Royal Plymouth. Richmond, 2019; tour, 2020 (cancelled due to COVID, production released via online streaming) directed by Matthew Xia

Ramin Gray's tenure (2011 - 2018) 
 2016 - Winter Solstice by Roland Schimmelpfennig, directed by Ramin Gray
 2016 -2018 - The Suppliant Women by Aeschylus, in a new version by David Greig, directed by Ramin Gray
 2015 - Living with the Lights On with Mark Lockyer, directed by Ramin Gray
 2015 - Martyr by Marius von Mayenburg, directed by Ramin Gray
 2014 - Blind Hamlet by Nassim Soleimanpour, directed by Ramin Gray
 2014 - Hendelsen, the Norwegian-language version of The Events by David Greig, translated by Oda Radoor, directed by Ramin Gray
 2014 - Chorale - A Sam Shepard Roadshow directed by Simon Usher
 2013 - Die Ereignisse, the German-language version of The Events by David Greig, translated by Brigitte Auer, directed by Ramin Gray
 2013 - The Events by David Greig, directed by Ramin Gray
 2012 - The Broadwalk Trilogy, comprising three short plays by Mikhail Durnenkov, Pavel Pryazhko, and Natal’ya Vorozhbit, directed by Ramin Gray and Sacha Wares
 2012 - Making the Sound of Loneliness, created by Jack Tarlton and Simon Usher, directed by Simon Usher
 2012 - Illusions by Ivan Viripaev, translated by Cazimir Liske, directed by Ramin Gray
 2012 - Crave by Sarah Kane, directed by Ramin Gray
 2012 - Wild Swans, adapted by Alex Woods from the memoir by Jung Chang, directed by Sacha Wares
 2011 - The Golden Dragon by Roland Schimmelpfennig, directed by Ramin Gray

Bijan Sheibani's tenure (2007 - 2011) 
 2011 - Fatherland by Tom Holloway, directed by Caroline Steinbeis
 2010 - Ivan and the Dogs by Hattie Naylor, directed by Ellen Mcdougall
 2010 - The Typist by Rebecca Lenkiewicz, directed by Bijan Sheibani
 2010 - Eurydice by Sarah Ruhl, directed by Bihan Sheibani
 2009 - Ghosts or Those Who Return by Henrik Ibsen, in a new version by Rebecca Lenkiewicz, directed by Bijan Sheibani
 2008 - The Brothers Size by Tarell Alvin McCraney, directed by Bijan Sheibani
 2008 - Gone Too Far! by Bola Agbaje, directed by Bijan Sheibani
 2007 - The Brothers Size by Tarell Alvin McCraney, directed by Bijan Sheibani

Spin-off 

 2009- Young Blood, play readings in co-production with The Writers Company
 2009- Lorca: A Dark River, as part of the Spanish Film Festival
 2008- Directing Workshops
 2008- Play Size, collaborative pieces with The Young Vic
 2008- Going Far!
 2008- Have We Gone Too Far?
 2008- A Slam Too Far
 2007- Panel Size
 2007- Play Size, collaborative pieces with The Young Vic
 2007- Poets Size, co-produced with Apples and Snakes

Gordon Anderson's tenure (2001 - 2007) 
 2006 - Bad Jazz by Robert Farquhar, directed by Gordon Anderson
 2006 - Gizmo Love by John Kolvenbach, directed by Matt Wilde
 2005 - A Brief History of Helen of Troy by Mark Schultz, directed by Gordon Anderson
 2004 - Jeff Koons by Rainald Goetz, directed by Gordon Anderson
 2004 - Country Music by Simon Stephens, directed by Gordon Anderson
 2003 - Excuses! by Joel Joan and Jordi Sanchez, directed by David Grindley
 2003 - One Minute by Simon Stephens, directed by Gordon Anderson
 2003 - Out of Our Heads directed by Gordon Anderson
 2002 - Arabian Night by Roland Schimmelpfennig, directed by Gordon Anderson
 2001 - In the Solitude of Cotton Fields by Bernard-Marie Koltès, directed by Gordon Anderson

Nick Philippou's tenure (1992 - 2000) 
 2000 - The Boy Who Left Home after the Brothers Grimm, directed by Nick Philippou
 2000 - Macbeth False Memory by Deborah Levy, directed by Nick Philippou
 1999 - The Tempest by William Shakespeare, directed by Nick Philippou
 1998 - Handbag or The Importance of Being Someone by Mark Ravenhill, directed by Nick Philippou
 1997 - Orpheus by Kenneth McLeish, directed by Nick Philippou
 1997 - Faust with Pete Bailie and Alain Pelletier, text by Mark Ravenhill, directed by Nick Philippou
 1996 - The Belle Vue by Ödön von Horváth, translated by Kenneth McLeish, directed by Nick Philippou
 1996 - Miss Julie by August Strindberg, directed by Nick Philippou
 1995 - The Modern Husband by Paul Godfrey, directed by Nick Philippou
 1995 - Venus and Adonis by William Shakespeare, directed by Nick Philippou
 1994 - Ion, the Lost Boy Found by Euripides, translated by Kenneth McLeish, directed by Nick Philippou
 1993 - Celestina, attributed to Fernando de Rojas, adapted by Max Hafler and Nick Philippou, directed by Nick Philippou
 1993 - The Maids by Jean Genet and No Way Out by Jean-Paul Sartre, directed by Nick Philippou
 1992 - The Coaldust Affair by Eugène Marin Labiche, directed by Jane Collins

Ceri Sherlock's tenure (1989 - 1992) 
 1992 - Woman of Flowers, Blodeuwedd, directed by Ceri Sherlock
 1991 - Punishment Without Revenge by Lope de Vega, directed by Ceri Sherlock
 1991 - La Ronde by Arthur Schnitzler, directed by Ceri Sherlock
 1991 - Mozart and Salieri by Alexander Pushkin, directed by Ceri Sherlock
 1990 - Torquato Tasso by Johann Wolfgang von Goethe, translated by Robert David MacDonald, directed by Ceri Sherlock
 1990 - Phaedra by Marina Tsvetayeva directed by Ceri Sherlock
 1989 - The Triumph of Love by Pierre de Marivaux, directed by Ceri Sherlock
 1989 - Cleopatra and Antony by William Shakespeare, directed by Malcolm Edwards

Mark Brickman's tenure (1986 - 1988) 
 1988 - The Illusion by Pierre Corneille, directed by Mark Brickman
 1988 - Princess Ivona by Witold Gombrowicz, directed by Mark Brickman
 1987 - Faustus, directed by Mark Brickman
 1987 - Heaven Bent, Hell Bound, directed by Mark Brickman
 1986 - The Bourgeois Gentleman by Molière, directed by Mark Brickman
 1986 - Hamlet by William Shakespeare, directed by Mark Brickman

John Retallack's tenure (1980 - 1985) 
 1986 - Ubu and the Clowns / Ubu in Chains, based on Ubu enchaîné by Alfred Jarry, directed by John Retallack
 1984 - A Doll's House by Henrik Ibsen, in a version by Michael Meyer, directed by John Retallack
 1984 - Twelfth Night by William Shakespeare, directed by John Retallack
 1984 - Peer Gynt by Henrik Ibsen, directed by Mark Brickman and John Retallack
 1983 - Don Juan, adapted by Nigel Gearing and John Retallack, directed by John Retallack
 1982 - Ubu the Vandalist, freely adapted from Ubu Roi by Alfred Jarry, directed by John Retallack
 1982 - The Provoked Wife by John Vanbrugh, directed by John Retallack
 1981 - The Tempest by John Vanbrugh, directed by John Retallack
 1980 - Berlin, Berlin, based on The Man Without Qualities by Robert Musil, music by Paul Sand, directed by John Retallack
 1980 - The Life and Death of Don Quixote, based on Don Quixote by Miguel de Cervantes, directed by John Retallack
 1978 -  Don Juan

References

External links
 

Theatre companies in London